Elizabeth Grietje Terburg Rowley (1927–2015) was a Latter-day Saint hymnwriter. Born in Florida, she later moved to Hawaii, to teach, and then to Salt Lake City, Utah. She wrote several hymns for the Church of Jesus Christ of Latter-day Saints (LDS Church), among which is "Be Thou Humble".

Life
Rowley was born Elizabeth Grietje Terburg in Homestead, Florida to a family of Dutch background. She studied at Oberlin College and the University of Miami. Upon graduation, Rowley moved to Hawaii to teach high school<ref name="legacy">Salt Lake Tribue''' , reproduced by Legacy.com.</ref> where she joined the Church of Jesus Christ of Latter-day Saints. Afterward, she moved to Salt Lake City, Utah, and spent most of her remaining life there. She married Grant Rowley in 1953.

Rowley composed many hymns and is most well known for "Be Thou Humble", included in her church's 1985 hymnal. The text, based on two verses of scripture, Doctrine and Covenants 112:10 and Ether 12:27, teaches that as one humbles oneself, their prayers are answered and they will ultimately return to the presence of their Heavenly Father.

Other hymns of hers are included in the Primary's Children's Songbook, including "I Want To Be a Missionary Now" and "Samuel Tells of the Baby Jesus. Her hymns earned several prizes in competitions. She served on the LDS General Music Committee.

Songs composed
Below is a concise list of the songs composed by Rowley.
A Smile Is Like a Sunshine
Distant Bells
Each Sunday Morning
I Want To Be a Missionary Now
Roll Your Hands
Be Thou Humble
All Thy Children Shall Be Taught of the Lord 
Ask, and Ye Shall Receive 
Father, We Thank Thee for the Night
Samuel Tells of the Baby Jesus 
Two Happy Feet

References

Sources
Steven E. Snow, "Be Thou Humble", Liahona, May 2016.
Mormon Literature Database entry for Rowley
Patricia Kelsey Graham. We Shall Make Music: Stories of the Primary Songs and How They Came To Be'', p. 68

External links
Be Thou Humble, interpreted by Sarah Morgan

1927 births
2015 deaths
American Latter Day Saint hymnwriters
Converts to Mormonism
Latter Day Saints from Florida
Latter Day Saints from Hawaii
Latter Day Saints from Ohio
Latter Day Saints from Utah
Oberlin College alumni
University of Miami alumni